The Havana Open was a golf tournament on the LPGA Tour from 1956 to 1958. It was played at the Biltmore Country Club in Havana, Cuba.

Winners
Havana Biltmore Open
1958 Fay Crocker

Havana Open
1957 Patty Berg
1956 Louise Suggs

References

Former LPGA Tour events
Golf tournaments in Cuba
Recurring sporting events established in 1956
Recurring sporting events disestablished in 1958
1956 establishments in Cuba
1958 disestablishments in Cuba
Women's sport in Cuba